Daniel Evan Button (November 1, 1917 – March 7, 2009) was a Republican member of the United States House of Representatives from New York. He died aged 91 at Albany Medical Center in Albany, New York.

Button was born in Dunkirk, New York. He graduated from the University of Delaware in 1938 and received a master's degree from Columbia University in 1939. He wrote for the Wilmington,(Del.) Morning News and the Associated Press from 1943 until 1947, when he turned to public relations at the University of Delaware. He had 5 children at this time. After this, he was assistant to the president of the State University of New York from 1952 until 1958. He was executive editor of the Albany Times-Union from 1960 until 1966. He was elected to Congress in 1966 as a Republican in a traditionally heavily Democratic district centered around Albany and Schenectady and served from January 3, 1967, until January 3, 1971. Button first ran for the seat vacated by Democrat Leo W. O'Brien in 1966 and was reelected to a second term in 1968.  However, a mid-decade redistricting ahead of the 1970 elections made his district even more heavily Democratic and drew the home of Democratic congressman and former Schenectady mayor Samuel Stratton into Button's district. By 1970, he had become an outspoken critic of the Vietnam War.  However, this was not enough to overcome the heavy partisan lean of his new district, and he was routed in the general election.

He was president of the national Arthritis Foundation (1971–75) and was editor of the national consumer magazine Science Digest (1976–80).  He wrote a legislative study of John V. Lindsay (Random House 1965) and also published "Take City Hall" about Albany politics (2003).  From 1994 to 2003 he was executive assistant to the president of the Commission on Independent Colleges and Universities in New York State. He was a resident of Delmar, New York when he died.

Sources

References

1917 births
2009 deaths
Columbia University alumni
People from Dunkirk, New York
University of Delaware alumni
Republican Party members of the United States House of Representatives from New York (state)
People from Bethlehem, New York
20th-century American politicians